Antal Benda (14 April 1910 – 29 January 1997) was a Hungarian field handball player. who competed in the 1936 Summer Olympics. He was born in Palánka in the Južna Bačka District of Serbia.
He competed in the 1936 Summer Olympics as part of the Hungarian field handball team, which finished fourth in the Olympic tournament. He played four matches.
He died on 29 January 1997 in Budapest, Hungary.

References

1910 births
1997 deaths
People from Bačka Palanka
Hungarian male handball players
Olympic handball players of Hungary
Field handball players at the 1936 Summer Olympics
Hungarians in Vojvodina